C. V. Ananda Bose is a politician & retired 1977-batch Indian Administrative Service officer,  currently serving as the Governor of West Bengal since 23 November 2022.

Overview
Ananda Bose is serving as the Governor of West Bengal. He has held the rank of Secretary to Govt. of India, Chief Secretary, and University Vice Chancellor. He is the Chairman of the Habitat Alliance, in consultative status with UN and was member of the UN Habitat Governing Council.

Bose has published 32 books in English, Malayalam and Hindi including novels, short stories, poems and essays.

Education & career

Bose had his education at Kuriakose Elias College, Mannanam, and at St. Berchmans College, Changanassery. He also holds a PhD from Birla Institute of Technology and Science, Pilani. Having joined IAS in 1977, Bose had the opportunity to introduce innovations in good governance which could ensure speedy and effective delivery of public services to the people.

Bose is a Fellow of the Lal Bahadur Shastri National Academy of Administration, Mussoorie, and has received the Jawaharlal Nehru Fellowship.

Bose has worked as District Collector, and Principal Secretary and Additional Chief Secretary in various ministries such as Education, Forest and Environment, Labour, and General Administration.

Bose has founded several movements and institutions in the field of affordable housing, good governance, science and technology, agriculture, rural development and education, such as Nirmithi Kendra (Building Centre), District Tourism Council and Habitat Alliance. He has represented India in the European Council for Nuclear Research (CERN), Geneva and the International Fusion Energy Organisation, ITER, France. He was Chairman of the Atomic Energy Education Society. United Nations have selected his initiatives as 'Global Best Practice' four times. Government of India awarded him the National (Special) Habitat award. He was the Head of the Supreme Court Committee on the treasures of Sree Padmanabhaswamy temple.

The Nirmithi Kendra (Building Centre) founded by him as District Collector of Kollam in 1985 to provide cost effective and environment friendly houses to the people, has emerged into a national network and become part of the national housing policy. This unique initiative in affordable housing is seen as a trigger for the Prime Minister's decision to provide affordable houses for all by 2022. Bose had the opportunity to meet and submit the proposal to Narendra Modi on 4 March 2014.

The District Tourism Promotion Council started by Bose in 1986 and replicated by the Government of Kerala in all the districts in the state, has been the nodal institution behind making Kerala God's own country. The national tourism policy recommends that this institution be replicated in all districts in the country.

Dhanwanthari Kendras initiated by Bose as institutions which provide ancillary medical facilities in hospitals, have been replicated in all districts in Kerala. The first ever attempt in India to provide medicines at discounted rate was started as part of Dhanwanthari Kendra. Later on Kerala government set up institutions to provide medicines at fair price on a regular basis. Pradhan Mantri Bhartiya Jan Aushadhi Pariyojana Kendra may be seen as a great culmination of a humble initiative in that direction taken 32 years back by Bose.

'The File to Field' program successfully launched in various places in Kerala as an effective mass contact program, has proved to be an administrative innovation which could redress the grievance of the public and accelerate development of backward rural areas. Union Minister of Tourism, Alphons Kannanthanam, is on record that this is the precursor to UN award-winning public service delivery system spearheaded by the then Chief Minister of Kerala .

The Gramotsava program initiated by Bose as sub collector, for the time bound development of rural areas, was officially evaluated by the Kerala Government as an effective development model worthy of replication and Government repeated the program in 200 panchayaths.

Sanjeevani Kendra, setup on the banks of the Ramsar site, Sasthamcotta Lake, with an extensive medicinal garden with facilities for Ayurveda treatment and research, was replicated in other parts of the state and Forest department adopted it as one of their flag ship projects.

In order to empower women and develop entrepreneurship among them, the Annapoorna society was set up in Kollam in 1986. They could run working women's hostel, undertake outdoor catering, establish mobile restaurants for street food, and undertake capacity building to equip women for income generating economic development activities. This has been evaluated as the forerunner or the renowned Kudumbashri Self Help Groups in Kerala.

The micro credit scheme introduced among the fisherwomen in Kollam district, popularly known as ration card loan, could save this marginalised section of society from the clutches of the usurious money lenders.

The first house boat in the state was introduced in Kollam during Bose's tenure and today houseboats are a major source of income in the tourism sector. Adventure sports got a boost in the state through the Adventure Park set up in Kollam in 1985. Subsequently, he could establish an Adventure Academy for this purpose.

The project Water Save launched to protect the Sasthamcotta fresh water lake in a campaign mode by raising a green belt around the lake, preventing soil erosion and removing restrictive practises, received the UN – sponsored Bremen Partnership Award from Germany.

The Labour Agenda initiated by Bose was adopted by the Government of Kerala for implementing sustainable developmental and welfare programs among the workers, was selected by the UN as Global Good Practice.

As Chairman of the Atomic Energy Education Society, Bose could set up a television studio for edutainment and introduce science fairs and youth festivals.

As MD NAFED, Bose could check corruption, bring the guilty to books and put the organization back on rails. When the price of essential commodities spiralled, Bose initiated the 'Easy market' scheme and the 'Farm gate to Home gate' direct marketing scheme for vegetables and horticulture produce. When onion price skyrocketed in Delhi, successful market intervention was made to sell onions at thirty percent less than the market price.

As the Administrator of the National Museum, Bose launched a 100-day programme which spelt out specific measures to revamp and revitalise the institution. Most of the improvements suggested were achieved in 60 days, such as opening the closed down galleries, modernising the display and lighting, launching outreach programmes to take the Museum to the community, arranging children's programme to ignite young minds to the greatness of India's national heritage, organising international exhibitions and launching the People's Museum movement, to mention a few.

References 
  – Asianet News Part 1
  – Asianet News Part 2
  – C.V. Ananda Bose Website
 – Doordarshan
 
 
 
 
 
 
 
 
 
 
 
 
 
 
 
 
 
 
 
 
 
 
 

Living people
People from Kottayam district
Jawaharlal Nehru Fellows
1951 births
Bharatiya Janata Party politicians from Kerala
Indian Administrative Service officers